This article is a resource of the native names of most of the major languages in the world. These are endonymic glossonyms.

Languages

A
Aari – Aari
 Spoken in: 
Aasáx † – Aasá
 Spoken in: 
Abaza – Aбаза бызшва
 Official language in: , 
Abellen – Ayta Abellen
 Spoken in: , Philippines
Abenaki † – Alnôba, Wôbanakiôdwawôgan
 Formerly spoken by: the American/Canadian  Abenaki Tribe
Abkhaz – Aҧсуа бызшәа, Aҧсшәа
 Official language in:  and the Autonomous Republic of Abkhazia, 
Abui – Abui
 Spoken in: 
Abure – ɔbule ɔyʋɛ
 Spoken in: 
Acehnese – Aceh or Bahsa Acèh
 Spoken in: 
Achang – Mönghsa, ŋa˨˩ʈʂhaŋ˨˩
 Spoken in:  and 
Achi – achi'
 Recognised Minority Language in: 
Achumawi † – Achomawi or Ajúmmááwí
 Formerly spoken in: 
Adai † – Tenánat Hadéyas
 Formerly spoken in: , 
Adangme – Adangbɛ
 Official language in: 
Adangbe – Adangbe
 Spoken in: 
Adele – Gidire
 Spoken in:  and 
Adioukrou – mɔjukru
 Spoken in: 
Adnyamathanha – Yura Ngawarla
 Spoken in: 
Adyghe – Адыгабзэ
 Western Circassian language. Official language in: , 
 Spoken also in: Turkey, Israel, Syria, Iraq, Germany, United States, Netherlands etc.
Afade – afaë
 Spoken in:  and 
Afar – Qafár af
 National Language in: 
Afrihili – El-Afrihili
 Proposed lingua franca of Africa
Afrikaans – Afrikaans
 Official language in: 
 Recognised Minority Language in:  and 
Aguacateco – awakateko
 Spoken in: 
Aghem – aghím
 Spoken in: 
Aghul – агъул чӀал
 Official language of: , 
Ahtna – Atnakenaege
 Official language of: , 
Ainu – アイヌ イタク, Aynu Itak
 Recognised Minority Language in: 
Ajië – A’jie, Ajië, Houailou, Wai, Wailu
 Official language in: Houaïlou, 
Akan – Akan, Fante, Twi
 Official language in:  Ghanaian/Ivoirian ethnic region of Akanland
Akkadian † – akkadû or 𒀝𒅗𒁺𒌑
 Formerly an Official language in: Akkad or central Mesopotamia which is modern-day 
 Later it became a lingua franca in the Middle East and 
Akkala Sámi – äh'k'el'säm'la
 Formerly spoken in: 
Aklanon – Akeanon, Binisaya nga Akeanon or Inakeanon
 Official Regional Language in: 
Akum – aakuem
 Spoken in:  and 
Alabama – Albaamaha
 Spoken in: , 
 Now extinct in: , 
Albanian – Shqip, Shqiptar
 Official language in:  and 
Algerian Saharan Arabic – dŷazāri' or جزائري
Aleut – Unangam Tunuu, Унáҥам Тунý
 Official language in: , 
 Spoken in: , 
Algonquin – ᐊᓂᔑᓈᐯᒧᐎᓐ or anicinâbemowin
 Spoken in: , 
Altai – Алтай тили
 Spoken in: , 
Alyutor – nəməlʔu
Amdang – Sìmí Amdangtí
 Spoken in: the Wadi Fira Region, 
Amharic – ኣማርኛ
 Official language in: 
Amo – Timap
 Spoken in: 
Ancient Egyptian Language † – 
 Formerly spoken in: Ancient Egypt
Ancient Greek † – Ἑλληνική
 Formerly spoken in: much of the Mediterranean Sea (until 1453)
Andalusian Arabic † – عربية أندلسية
 Formerly spoken in: Al-Andalus (modern-day  and )
Anfillo – Mao
 Spoken in: 
Angika – अंगिका
 Official language in: , 
 Spoken in: 
Angloromani – Romanichal
 Spoken in: the 
Apache – Ndéé
 Spoken in: Southwestern 
Apsaalooke – Apsaalooke
 Spoken in: Great Plains, 
Arabela – Tapweyokwaka
 Spoken in: 
Arabic – العربية
 Official language in: 27 countries and 4 international organizations
Aragonese – l'Aragonés
 Official language in: , 
Aramaic – ܐܪܡܝܐ
Arapaho – Hinono'eitiit

 Spoken by: the  Arapaho people, 
Arbëreshë Albanian – Arbërisht
 Spoken in: 
Archi – аршаттен
 Spoken in: , 
Arikara – Sáhniš
 Spoken in: , 
Arin † – bbˈirk
 Formerly spoken in: 
Armenian – Հայերեն
 Official language in:  and 
Aromanian – Aromanian
Arpitan – arpetan or francoprovençâl
 Spoken in:  and 
 Recognised Minority Language in: 
Arrernte – Arrernte Angkentye
 Spoken in: , 
Arvanitika – arbërisht or αρbε̰ρίσ̈τ
 Spoken in: 
Assamese – অসমীয়া
Assiniboine – Nakhóda
 Spoken in:  and the 
Asturian – Asturianu
 Spoken in: , 
Auslan – Sign Language
 Official language in: 
Atikamekw – Nēhinawēwin
 Spoken in: , 
Avar – МагIарул МацI
Avestan – 𐬆𐬬𐬈𐬯𐬙𐬆𐬥
 Spoken on: the eastern  Iranian Plateau
Awadhi – अवधी
 Spoken in: 
Aweer – Boni
 Spoken in: 
Awijilah – Tawjilit, طاوجيليت or ⵟⴰⵡⵊⵉⵍⵉⵜ
 Spoken in: 
Ayapaneco – Ayapaneco
 Spoken in: , 
Aymara – Aymar Aru
Äynu – ئەينۇ
 Spoken in: the Xinjiang Uyghur Autonomous Region, 
Azerbaijani – Azərbaycanca
 Spoken in: ,  and 
Azoyu Me'phaa – me̱'pha̱a̱ tsíndíí
 Spoken in: ,

B
Babine – Witsuwit’en, ᗔᙣᗔᗥᐣ
 Spoken in: British Columbia  in Canada 
Baga † – Barka
 Formerly spoken in: the Republic of Guinea 
Bai – 白语
 Spoken in: the Yunnan Province, People's Republic of China 
Baki – Baki
 Spoken in: Vanuatu 
Balinese – ᬩᬲᬩᬮᬶ
 Spoken in: Bali , Republic of Indonesia 
Balti – སྦལ་ཏིའི་སྐད་, بلتی
 Spoken in: Baltistan, Azad Jammu and Kashmir, Islamic Republic of Pakistan  and Ladakh, Jammu and Kashmir, Republic of India 
Bambara – Bamanankan
 Spoken in: the Republic of Mali 
Bantu † – Narrow Bantu
 Formerly spoken in: Subsaharan Africa
Basa-Gumna † – Basa-Kaduna, Basa Kuta
 Formerly spoken in: Chanchaga, Niger State, Federal Republic of Nigeria 
Bashkir – башҡорт Теле, Başqort Tele
 Official language in: the Republic of Bashkortostan, Russian Federation  and the Republic of Kazakhstan 
Basque – Euskara
 Official language in: Basque Country  and Navarre , Kingdom of Spain 
 Spoken in the French Basque Country, Atlantic Pyrenees  Republic of France , but with no legal status.
Bassa – ɓasaá
 Spoken by: Liberian/Sierra Leonean Bassa People
Batak – 
 Spoken by: the Batak people of the North Sumatra, Republic of Indonesia 
Belarusian – Беларуская
 Official language in: the Republic of Belarus 
 Recognised Minority Language in: Ukraine 
Bemba – iciBemba
 Official language in: the Republic of Zambia 
Bengali – বাংলা
 Official language in: the People's Republic of Bangladesh  and the Republic of India 
Berber – Tamaziɣt, Tamazight, or ⵜⴰⵎⴰⵣⵉⵖⵜ
 Spoken in: Northern Africa
Berta – Gebeto or Wetawit
 Spoken in: the Benishangul-Gumuz Region, Federal Democratic Republic of Ethiopia
Betawi – Basè Betawi, Basa Betawi
 Spoken in: Jakarta , Tangerang City, Tangerang Regency, South Tangerang City in Banten , Bekasi City, Bekasi Regency, Bogor Regency, Depok City in West Java , Indonesia 
Bezhta – бежкьалас миц
 Spoken in: Dagestan , Russia 
Bhojpuri – भोजपुरी, بھوجپوري
 Spoken in: Bihar, Republic of India ; Jharkhand, Republic of India ; Uttar Pradesh, Republic of India ; Co-operative Republic of Guyana ; Republic of Suriname ; and Republic of Trinidad and Tobago 
Big Nambas – V'ənen Taut
 Spoken in: Malakula, Vanuatu 
Bijago – Kangaki-Kagbaaga-Kajoko Bidyogo
 Spoken in: Guinea Bissau 
Bikol – Bikol
 Spoken in Bicol Region, Philippines 
Bislama – Bislama
 Official language in: Republic of Vanuatu 
Blackfoot – ᑯᖾᖹ, ᓱᖽᐧᖿ
 Spoken by: the American/Canadian Blackfoot Tribe
Bodo – बड़ो
 Spoken in: Republic of India  and Democratic Republic of Nepal 
Bosnian – Босански, Bosanski
 Official language in: Bosnia and Herzegovina  and Montenegro 
 Recognised Minority Language in: Republic of Albania , Kosovo , North Macedonia , and Republic of Serbia 
Breton – Brezhoneg
 Spoken in: Brittany, French Republic 
Buginese – ᨅᨔ ᨕᨘᨁᨗ
 Spoken in: South Sulawesi, Republic of Indonesia 
Buhid – ᝊᝓᝑᝒᝇ
 Spoken in: Mindoro, Philippines 
Bulgarian – български език
 Official language in: Republic of Bulgaria , and Hellenic Republic 
 Recognised Minority Language in: Romania , Republic of Serbia , and Ukraine 
Burmese – မြန်မာစာ or မြန်မာစကား
 Official language in: Republic of the Union of Myanmar 
Buryat – буряад хэлэн
 Official language in: Buryatia , Russia 
Bussa – Mossittaata,  Mossiya, ሞስሲትቷታ or ሞስሲያ
 Spoken in: Ethiopia

C
Caddo – Hasí:nay
 Spoken in: Oklahoma  in the United States 
Cahuilla – Ivia
 Spoken in: the southern area of the State of California, United States 
Canichana † – ?
 Spoken in: Bolivia 
Cantonese – 廣東話
 Official language in: Hong Kong Special Administration Region, People's Republic of China , Macau special Administrative Region, People's Republic of China 
Carrier – ᑐᑊᘁᗕᑋᗸ
 Spoken in: British Columbia, Canada 
Catalan – Català
 Official language in: Principality of Andorra ; the Balearic Islands, Kingdom of Spain ; Catalonia, Kingdom of Spain ; and the Valencian Community, Kingdom of Spain 
 Recognised Minority Language in: Pyrénées-Orientales, French Republic ; Sardinia, Italian Republic ; and Aragón, Kingdom of Spain 
Catawba † – Iyeye
 Formerly spoken in: North Carolina  in the United States 
Cayuga – Gayogo̱hó:nǫ’
 Spoken by: the Iroquois Cayuga people living in the Canadian First Nation reservation of the Six Nations of the Grand River First Nation 
Cebuano – Bisaya, Sinugboanon
 Spoken in: Central Visayas and Mindanao, Philippines 
Chalcatongo Mixtec – Chalcatongo
 Spoken in: Oaxaca  in Mexico 
Cham – ꨌꩌ
 Spoken in: Cambodia 
Chamorro – Chamoru, Fino'Chamorro
 Official language in: Guam  and the Commonwealth of the Northern Mariana Islands 
Chechen – Нохчийн Mотт
 Official language in: the Chechen Republic, Russian Federation  and the Republic of Dagestan, Russian Federation 
Cherokee – ᏣᎳᎩ, ᏣᎳᎩ ᎦᏬᏂᎯᏍᏗ
 Official language in: the Native American tribe of the Cherokee , in Oklahoma 
Chewa – Nyanja
 Official language in: Republic of Malawi  and Republic of Zambia 
Cheyenne – Tsėhesenėstsestotse, Tsisinstsistots
 Spoken in: Montana, United States  and Oklahoma, United States 
Chhattisgarhi – छत्तीसगढ़ी
 Spoken in: Republic of India 
Chickasaw – Chikasha
 Spoken in: Oklahoma, United States 
Chinese – 汉语, 漢語, 华语, 華語, or 中文
 Official language in: the People's Republic of China ; Republic of Singapore ; Republic of China ; and the Wa State, Republic of the Union of Myanmar
 Recognised Minority Language in: Malaysia , the Philippines , Nation of Brunei, the Abode of Peace , and the United States 
Chinese (Classical) –  or 
 Spoken in: the People's Republic of China , Japan , the Korean Peninsula , the Republic of China , and Socialist Republic of Vietnam 
Chipewyan – ᑌᓀᓲᒢᕄᓀ, Dene Suline, Dëne Sųłiné
 Spoken in: Canada 
Chittagonian – চাটগাঁইয়া বুলি
 Spoken in: Bangladesh 
Chocangaca – ཁྱོ་ཅ་ང་ཅ་ཁ་
 Spoken in: Bhutan  
Choctaw – Chahta', Chahta Anumpa
 Spoken in: The United States of America 
Chukchi – чаучу
 Spoken in: Russia in the Chukotka Autonomous Okrug 
Chulym – Ось тили, тадар тили
 Spoken in: Krasnoyarsk Krai  and Tomsk Oblast, Russia 
Chuvash – Чӑвашла, Çăvaşla
 Official language in: the Chuvash Republic, Russian Federation 
Cimbrian – Zimbrisch
 Spoken in: the Italian Republic 
Cocos Islands Malay – Basa Pulu Cocos
 Spoken in Cocos (Keeling) Islands , Australia  and Malaysia 
Comanche – Nʉmʉ Tekwapʉ
 Spoken in: Oklahoma, United States 
Cook Islands Māori – ‘Airani
 Official language in: Cook Islands 
Coptic – ⲘⲉⲧⲢⲉⲙ̀ⲛⲭⲏⲙⲓ
 The Coptic language is a Coptic liturgical language 
Cornish – Kernewek, Kernowek
 Recognised Minority Language in: Cornwall , the United Kingdom of Great Britain and Northern Ireland 
Corsican – Corsu
 Recognised Minority Language in: the French Republic 
Cree – ᓀᐦᐃᔭᐍᐏᐣ
 Official language in: the Northwest Territories, Canada 
Crimean Tatar
 Official language in: Crimea, Ukraine 
Croatian – Hrvatski
 Official language in: Bosnia and Herzegovina ; Republic of Croatia ; and Autonomous Province of Vojvodina, Republic of Serbia 
 Recognised Minority Language in: Burgenland, Republic of Austria ; Baranya County, Southern Transdanubia, Hungary ; Molise, Italian Republic ; Montenegro ; Carașova, Caraș-Severin County Romania ; and Lupac, Caraș-Severin County, Romania 
Cupeño † – Kupangaxwicham Pe'memelki
 Formerly spoken in: the southern area of the State of California, United States 
Cypriot Arabic – Sanna
 Recognised Minority Language in: Cyprus 
Czech – Český Jazyk, Čeština
 Official language in: the Czech Republic

D
Dair – Thaminyi or طهامينيي
 Spoken in: Sudan 
Dakhini – دکنی
 Official language in: the Republic of India  and the United Arab Emirates 
Dakota – Dakȟótiyapi
 Spoken in: Canada  and the United States 
Dalecarlian – Dalmål
 Spoken in: Kingdom of Sweden 
Danish – Dansk
 Official language in: Kingdom of Denmark  and the Faroe Islands 
 Recognised Minority Language in: Federal Republic of Germany , Greenland , and Republic of Iceland 
Dargwa – Дарган Mез
 Official language in: the Republic of Dagestan, Russian Federation 
Dari – فارسی, دری, دريلو, or Yazdi
 The Dari language is a Zoroastrian liturgical language 
Dhivehi – ދިވެހި
 Official language in: the Republic of the Maldives 
Dolgan – Дулҕан, Dulğan, Һака, Haka
 Spoken in: Krasnoyarsk Krai , Russia 
Domari – Dômarî
 Spoken in: Middle East , North Africa  and the Caucasus
Drehu – Dehu, Lifou, Lifu, Qene Drehu
 Official language in: Lifou, New Caledonia 
Dungan – 回族语言, Xуэйзў йүян
 Spoken by: the Central Asian Dungan people
Durkha – ȭར་ཁ་
 Spoken in: Bhutan 
Dutch – Nederlands
 Official language in: Aruba , Kingdom of Belgium , Country of Curaçao, the Netherlands, Sint Maarten, and Republic of Suriname, 
Dutton World Speedwords – rapmotz
 International Auxiliary Language 
Dzongkha – རྫོང་ཁ་
 Official language in: Kingdom of Bhutan

E
E – 誒
 Spoken in: Guangxi  in China 
Egyptian Arabic † – اللغة المصرية العامية
 Formerly spoken in: Lower Egypt
English – English
 Official language in: 54 countries and 27 non-sovereign entities
Erzya – Эрзянь Kель
 Official language in: the Republic of Mordovia, Russian Federation 
Esperanto – Esperanto
 International Auxiliary Language 
Estonian – Eesti
 Official language in: Republic of Estonia 
Even – эвэн то̄рэ̄нни or эвэды
 Spoken in: Siberia 
Evenki – Эвэды̄ турэ̄н
 Spoken in: the Chinese provinces of Heilongjiang and Inner Mongolia , the Mongolian aimag of the Selenge Province , and the Russian krai of Krasnoyarsk Krai 
Ewe – Èʋe, Èʋegbe
 Spoken by: the Beninois/Togolese Ewe people 
Extremaduran – Estremeñu
 Spoken in: Salamanca   in Spain 
Eyak † – dAXhunhyuuga'
 Formerly an Official language in: the American state of Alaska

F
Fala – Fala
 Spoken in: Val de Xálima , Extremadura  (Spain) 
Faroese – Føroyskt
 Official language in: the Faroe Islands 
 Recognised Minority Language in: Denmark 
Fijian – Na vosa vaka-Viti, Vakaviti
 Official language in Fiji 
Fiji Hindi – फिजी बात or Fiji Baat
 Spoken in: Fiji 
Filipino – Wikang Filipino
 Official language in: the Philippines 
Filipino Sign Language – Sign Language
 Official language in: the Philippines 
Finnish – Suomi
 Official language in: Finland  and the Russian autonomous republic of Karelia ; recognised as a minority language in Sweden
Fon – Fon gbè, Fɔngbè
 Spoken by: the Beninois/Nigerian Fon people
French – Français
 Official language in: 38 countries, 14 dependant entities, and 119 international organisations
Frisian (North) – Noordfreesk
 Official language in: the German archipelago of Heligoland  and the German district of Nordfriesland 
Frisian (Saterland) – Seeltersk
 Spoken in: the German municipality of Saterland 
Frisian (West) – Frysk
 Official language in: the Dutch province of Friesland 
Friulian – Furlan
 Spoken in: Italy 
Fula – Fulfulde, Pulaar, Pular
 Spoken in: Central Africa
Fur – For
 Spoken in: the Republic of Chad  and Darfur, Republic of the Sudan

G
Ga – Gã
 Official language in: Ghana 
Gagauz – Gagauz
 Official language in: in: Gagauzia  in Moldova 
 Recognised Minority Language in: Ukraine 
Galician – Galego
 Official language in: the Spanish autonomous community of Galicia 
Gallo – Galo
 Recognised Minority Language in: France mainly: Brittany , Normandy 
Gan – 赣语, 贛語
 Spoken in: the Chinese provinces of Anhui, Fujian, Hubei, Hunan, and Jiangxi 
Garre – ?
 Spoken in: Somalia , Ethiopia  and Kenya 
Ge'ez – ግዕዝ
 Spoken in: Eritrea , Ethiopia , and Israel 
Georgian – ქართული
 Official language in: Georgia 
German – Deutsch
 Official language in: Austria , the Belgian German-Speaking Community , Germany , Liechtenstein , Luxembourg , the Italian autonomous province of South Tyrol , and Switzerland 
 Recognised Minority Language in: the Brazilian city of Pomerode , the Czech Republic , Denmark , Hungary , the Italian autonomous province of Trentino , Kazakhstan , Namibia , Poland , Romania , Russia , the Slovak municipality of Krahule , and the Vatican City  (Administrative and commanding language of the Swiss Guard)
Gikuyu – Gĩkũyũ
 Spoken in: the Kenyan Central Province 
Gilbertese – Taetae ni Kiribati
 Official language in: Kiribati 
Godoberi – ГъибдилӀи Mицци, Ɣibdiƛi Micci
 Spoken in: the southwest area of the Russian autonomous republic of Dagestan 
Gothic † – 𐌲𐌿𐍄𐌹𐍃𐌺
 Formerly spoken in: pre-18th. Century Europe
Greek – Ελληνικά
 Official language in: Cyprus  and Greece 
 Recognised Minority Language in: Albania , Armenia , Hungary  Italy , Romania , Turkey , and Ukraine 
Greenlandic – Kalaallisut
 Official language in: Greenland 
Grenadian French Creole – Patwa
 Spoken in: Grenada 
Guaraní – Avañe'ẽ or Javy ju
 Official language in: the Argentinian province of Corrientes , Bolivia , and Paraguay 
Gujarati – ગુજરાતી
 Official language in: the Indian union territories of Dadra and Nagar Haveli and Daman and Diu, and the Indian state of Gujarat
Gumuz – Bega
 Spoken in: the Benishangul-Gumuz Region, Federal Democratic Republic of Ethiopia 
Gurung – तमु क्यी
 Official language in: the Indian state of Sikkim 
Gwich'in – Gwich'in
 Official language in: the Canadian federal territory of the Northwest Territories

H
Haida – Xaat Kíl
 Official language in: the Council of the Haida Nation  and the US  state of Alaska 
Hainanese – 海南話
 Spoken in: the Chinese province of Hainan 
Haitian Creole – Kreyòl Ayisyen
 Official language in: Haiti 
Hakka – 客家話, 客家话
 Spoken by: the Hakka people
Harari – ሃራሪ
 Spoken in: the Ethiopian kilil of the Harari Region 
Haryanvi – हरयाणवी
 Spoken in: Haryana  in India 
Hausa – حَوْسَ
 Spoken by: the Hausa people
Hawaiian – ʻŌlelo Hawaiʻi
 Official language in: the American state of Hawaii 
Hebrew – 
 Official language in: Israel 
 The Hebrew language is a Jewish liturgical language 
Herero – Otjiherero
 Spoken in: Botswana  and Namibia 
Hiligaynon – Ilonggo
 Spoken in the provinces of Iloilo and in Negros Occidental in the Philippines 
Hill Mari – Мары йӹлмӹ
 Official language in: Mari El , Russia 
Himba – Omuhimba, Simba
 Spoken in: Gabon 
Hindi – हिन्दी
 Official language in: India 
Hindko – ہندکو
 Spoken in: Pakistan
Hindustani – ہندوستانی, हिन्दुस्तानी
 Spoken in: India  and Pakistan 
Hinuq – гьинузас мец
 Spoken in: Dagestan , Russia 
Hiri Motu – Hiri Motu
 Official language in: Papua New Guinea 
Hmong – lol Hmongb, lus Hmoob, lug Moob
 Spoken in: China , French Guiana , Laos , Thailand , America , and Vietnam 
Hopi – Hopilàvayi or Hopílavayi
 Spoken in: the northeastern area of the State of Arizona, United States 
Hungarian – Magyar
 Official language in: Hungary 
 Recognised Minority Language in: Austria , Croatia , Romania , Serbia , Slovakia , Slovenia , and Ukraine

I
Icelandic – Íslenska
 Official language in: Iceland 
Ido – Ido
International auxiliary language 
Igala – Igala
Spoken in: Nigeria 
Igbo – Asụsụ Igbo
 Official language in: Nigeria 
 Recognised Minority Language in: Equatorial Guinea 
Ik – Icetot
 Spoken in: the Republic of Uganda 
Ili Turki – İlı turkeşi, И̇лı туркес̧и, ي̇لي تۋركەسي
 Spoken in: China 
Ilocano – Iloko, Pagsasao nga Iloko
 Official language in: the Philippine province of La Union 
Indonesian – Bahasa Indonesia
 Official language in: Indonesia 
Ingush – ГӀалгӀай мотт
 Official language in: the Russian autonomous republic of Ingushetia 
Interlingua – Interlingua
International auxiliary language 
Interlingue (Occidental) – Interlingue
International Auxiliary language 
Interslavic – Medžuslovjansky, Меджусловјанскы
Zonal auxiliary language for Slavs 
Inuinnaqtun – ?
 Official language in: Nunavut  in Canada 
Inuit Sign Language – Atgangmuurngniq, ᐊᑦᒐᖕᒨᕐᖕᓂᖅ or ᐆᒃᑐᕋᐅᓯᖏᑦ
 Spoken in: Nunavut   in Canada 
Inuktitut – ᐃᓄᒃᑎᑐᑦ
 Official language in: the Canadian provinces of the Northwest Territories  and Nunavut ; the Nunavik area of the Canadian province of Quebec ; and the Canada-administrated/Inuit-claimed autonomous area of Nunatsiavut
Inupiaq – Iñupiatun
Official language in: the American state of Alaska 
Irish – Gaeilge
 Official language in: Ireland 
 Recognised Minority Language in: Northern Ireland, United Kingdom 
Isthmus Nahuatl – Mela'tájtol
 Spoken in: the Mexican states of Tabasco  and Veracruz 
Istro Romanian – Istroromånă
 Recognised Minority Language in: Istria County , Italy , Sweden , Germany  and North America and South America
Italian – Italiano
 Official language in: the Croatian Istria County , Italy , San Marino , the Slovenian region of Slovenian Istria , Switzerland , and the Vatican City 
Ivatan – Chirin nu Ibatan
 Spoken in: Batanes, Philippines

J
Japanese – 日本語, 
 National language in: Japan 
Jarawa – Aongəŋ
 Official language in: Andaman and Nicobar Islands 
Javanese – ꦧꦱꦗꦮ
 Spoken in: the Indonesian islands of Borneo and Java, New Caledonia , and Suriname 
Judaeo-Spanish – , Ladino
 Spoken by: the Sephardim Jewish Diaspora 
Jutish – Jydsk
 Spoken in: Denmark 
Jèrriais – Jèrriais
 Spoken in: the British crown dependency of Jersey  and the British royal fief of Sark

K
Kabardian – Адыгэбзэ
 Eastern Circassian language. Official language in: the Russian autonomous republics of Kabardino-Balkaria  and Karachay-Cherkessia 
 Spoken also in Turkey, Syria, Iraq, Germany, United States, Netherlands etc.
Kabyle – شئعم
 Spoken in: Algeria 
Kaingang – Kanhgág
 Spoken in: Brazil 
Kaixana – Too few people for it to be written/typed (1 Person as of 2020)
 Spoken in: Brazil 
Kapampangan – Kapampangan
 Spoken in: Pampanga, Philippines 
Kannada – ಕನ್ನಡ
 Official language in: the Indian state of Karnataka 
Kanuri – Kanuri
 Spoken in: Cameroon , Chad , Niger , and Nigeria 
Karakalpak – Қарақалпақ тили, Qaraqalpaq tili
 Official language in: the Uzbek autonomous republic of Karakalpakstan 
Karamojong – ŋaKaramojoŋ or ŋaKarimojoŋ
 Spoken in: the Moroto District, Karamoja Sub-Region, Northern Region, Republic of Uganda 
Karelian – Karjalan Kieli
 Recognised Minority Language in: Finland  and the Russian autonomous republic of Karelia 
Kashmiri – كٲشُر,	कॉशुर, Kạ̄šur, Koshur
 Official language in: India 
Kashubian – Kaszëbsczi Jãzëk
 Official language in: Some communes in the Polish voivodeship of Pomerania 
Kazakh – Қазақ Tілі
 Official language in: Kazakhstan  and the Russian autonomous republic of the Altai Republic 
Kelantanese Malay – بهاس ملايو كلنتن or Baso Kelate
 Spoken in: the Malaysian state of Kelantan 
Kendeje – Kendeje
 Spoken in: Ouaddaï Region, Republic of Chad 
Ket – Остыганна ӄа'
 Spoken in: the middle Yenisei basin in Krasnoyarsk Krai  in Russia 
Khakas – Хакас Tілі
 Spoken in: the Russian autonomous republic of Khakassia 
Khanty – ханты
 Spoken in: Khanty-Mansi , Yamalo-Nenets  and Tomsk Oblast  in Russia 
Khmer – ភាសាខ្មែរ
 Official language in: Cambodia 
Khoekhoe – Khoekhoegowab
 National Language in: Namibia 
Khowar – کھوار
 Official language in: Pakistan 
Kimki – ?
 Spoken in: Indonesia 
Kinyarwanda – Ikinyarwanda or Runyarwanda
 Official language in: Rwanda 
Komi – Коми
 Official language in: Komi Republic , Russia 
Konkani – कोंकणी, Konknni, കൊങ്കണി, ಕೊಂಕಣಿ
 Official language in: the Indian state of Goa 
Korean – 조선말, 한국어
 Official language in: North Korea , South Korea , and the Chinese autonomous prefecture of Yanbian 
Koryak – нымылан
 Spoken in: Chukotka , Russia 
Kosraean – Kosrae
 Official language in: Kosrae  in Micronesia 
Kuanua – Tinata Tuna
 Spoken in: East New Britain Province  in Papua New Guinea 
Kunama – ?
 Spoken in: Eritrea  and Ethiopia 
Kuliak – Rub
 Spoken in: the Republic of Uganda
Kumyk – Къумукъ Tил
 Official language in: the Russian autonomous republic of Dagestan 
Kurdish – Kurdí, کوردی, or K’öрди
 Official language in: Iraq  Turkey  Iran  Syria  Armenia 
 Recognised Minority Language in: Germany 
Kurdish (Southern) – کوردی خوارین,  Kurdîy Xwarîn
 Spoken in: Iran and Iraq
Kurmanji – Kurmancî, کورمانجی
 Spoken in: Turkey, Iran, Iraq, and Syria
Kutchi – کچھی or કચ્છી
 Spoken in: South Asia
Kwadi † – !Kwa/tse
 Formerly spoken in: Angola 
 (Kwadi is a "click language").
Kyrgyz – Кыргыз тили
 Official language in: Kyrgyzstan  and the Russian autonomous republic of the Altai Republic

L
Laal – yəw láà:l
 Spoken in: Chad 
Ladakhi – ལ་དྭགས་སྐད།
 Spoken in: China , India , and Pakistan 
Ladin – Ladin
 Spoken in: Italy 
Lakha – ལ་ཁ་
 Spoken in: Wangdue Phodrang  and Trongsa 
Lakota – Lakȟótiyapi
 Spoken by: the Lakota people 
Lao – ພາສາລາວ
 Official language in: Laos 
Latin – Lingua Latīna
 Official language in the Vatican City 
 Formerly spoken in the Roman Republic, Roman Empire, and in legal court
Latvian – latviešu
 Official language in: Latvia 
Laz – ლაზური ნენა
 Spoken in: Georgia  and Turkey 
Leonese – Llïonés
 Official language in: the Spanish autonomous community of Castile and León 
Lepcha – ᰛᰩᰵ་ᰛᰧᰶᰵ
 Official language in: the Indian state of Sikkim 
Limbu – ᤕᤰᤌᤢᤱ ᤐᤠᤴ
 Official language in: the Indian state of Sikkim 
Limburgish – Lèmburgs
 Official language in: the Netherlands 
Lingala – Lingála
 Official language in: the Democratic Republic of the Congo  and the Republic of the Congo 
Lisu – ꓡꓲ-ꓢꓴ or ꓡꓲꓢꓴ
 Official language in: the Chinese autonomous prefecture of Nujiang Lisu  and the Chinese autonomous county of Weixi Lisu 
Lithuanian – Lietuvių
 Official language in: Lithuania 
 Recognised Minority Language in: Poland 
Livonian – Līvõ Kēļ or Rāndakēļ
 Spoken in: Latvia 
Low German – Plattdüütsch
 Spoken in: Denmark , Germany , and the Netherlands 
Low Prussian Dialect – Niederpreußisch
 Formerly spoken in: Prussia , now some scattered speakers in the Americas
Luba-Kasai – Tshiluba
 Spoken in: the Democratic Republic of the Congo 
Luganda – Luganda, LùGáànda, Oluganda
 Spoken in: Uganda 
Luiseño – Cham'teela
 Spoken in: the southern area of the State of California, United States 
Luo – Kavirondo or Dholuo
 Spoken in: Kenya  and Tanzania 
Luri – لری or Lori
 Spoken in: Iran , Iraq , Kuwait , Oman , and the United Arab Emirates 
Luxembourgish – Lëtzebuergesch
 Official language in: Luxembourg 
 Recognised Minority Language in: the Belgian community of the French Community of Belgium

M
Maasai – ɔl Maa
 Spoken by: the Kenyan/Tanzanian Maasai people 
Macedonian – Mакедонски
 Official language in: North Macedonia 
 Recognised Minority Language in: Albania , Romania , and Serbia 
Madurese – Basa Mathura
 Official language in: East Java  in Indonesia 
Magahi – मगही
 Spoken in: India  and Nepal 
Maguindanao – Maguindanao
 Spoken in: Maguindanao, Philippines 
Magar – मगर भाषा
 Official language in: the Indian state of Sikkim 
Maithili – मैथिली, মৈথিলী
 Official language in: the Indian state of Bihar  and Nepal 
Makassarese – Basa Mangkasara', ᨅᨔ ᨆᨀᨔᨑ
 Spoken in: the southern tip of the Indonesian province of South Sulawesi 
Malagasy – Malagasy
 Official language in: Madagascar 
Malay – بهاس ملايو or Bahasa Melayu
 Official language in: Brunei , Indonesia , Malaysia , and Singapore 
Malayalam – മലയാളം
 Official language in: the Indian state of Kerala and the Indian territories of Lakshadweep and Puducherry 
Maltese – Malti
 Official language in: Malta 
Manchu – 
 Spoken by: the Manchu people 
Mandarin – 國語
 Spoken in: Most of China 
Manx – Gaelg
 Official language in: the Isle of Man 
Marathi – मराठी
 Official language in: the Indian state of Maharashtra and the Indian territories of Daman and Diu and Dadra and Nagar Haveli 
Marshallese – Ebon, Kajin M̧ajeļ, Kajin Majõl
 Official language in: the Marshall Islands 
Marwari – मारवाड़ी, مارواڑی
 Spoken in: Rajasthan  in India 
Masalit – kana masara
 Spoken in: Dar Masalit, Darfur, Republic of the Sudan 
Meadow Mari – олык марий
 Official language in: Mari El , Russia 
Meitei – মনিপুরি, মৈতৈলোল্, মৈতৈলোন্, মৈথৈ
 Official language in: the Indian state of Manipur 
Miami-Illinois – Myaamia
 Spoken in: the Illinois Confederation 
Michoacán Nahuatl – Pómaro Nahuatl
 Spoken in: Mexico 
Min – 閩語 or 闽语
 Spoken in: the southeastern area of China 
Min Bei – 闽北语
 Spoken in: the Chinese prefecture-level city of Nanping 
Min Dong – 閩東語
 Spoken in: the Chinese prefecture-level cities of Fuzhou and Ningde 
Min Nan – 閩南語 or 闽南语
 Spoken in: the southeastern area of China 
Min Zhong – 闽中话
 Spoken in: the southeastern area of China 
Mon – ဘာသာ မန်
 Spoken in: the Myanma delta of the Irrawaddy River 
Mongolian – Монгол Хэл, 
 Official language in: the Chinese autonomous region of Inner Mongolia  and Mongolia 
Montenegrin – crnogorski, црногорски
 Official language in: Montenegro 
 Recognised Minority Language in: Albania , Bosnia and Herzegovina , and the Serbian municipality of Mali Iđoš in the autonomous region of Vojvodina 
Mor – ?

 Spoken in: West Papua, Indonesia 

Muscogee Creek – Mvskoke, Mvskokē
 Spoken in: the American states of Alabama , Florida , Georgia , and Oklahoma 
Musgu – Mulwi
 Spoken in: Cameroon  and Chad 
Muskum † – Muzuk
 Formerly spoken in: Chad 
Mussau-Emira – Mussau-Emira
 Spoken in: Mussau Island of St Matthias Islands  and Emira Island  part of Papua New Guinea 
Māori – te Reo Māori
 Official language in: New Zealand

N
Nagumi † – Gong or Ngong
 Formerly spoken in: Cameroon 
Nahuatl – Māsēwallahtōlli, Mexicano, or Nāhuatlahtōlli
 Official language in: Mexico 
Naukan Yupik – ?
 Spoken in: Chukotka Autonomous Okrug , Russia 
Navajo – Diné bizaad
 Spoken on the Navajo Nation 
Ndyuka – 
 Spoken in: French Guiana  and Suriname 
Nepal Bhasa – नेपाल भाषा
 Official language in: the Indian state of Sikkim   and Nepal 
Nepali – नेपाली
 Official language in: the Indian district of the Darjeeling district , the Indian state of Sikkim , and Nepal 
New Zealand Sign Language – Sign Language
 Official language in: New Zealand 
Ngbee † – Lingbee
 Formerly spoken in: the Democratic Republic of the Congo  
Nihali – ?
 Spoken in: Madhya Pradesh  and Maharashtra  in India 
Northern Thai – ᨣᩴᩤᨾᩮᩥᩬᨦ
 Spoken in: the northern area of Thailand , and some other parts of Southeast Asia
Norwegian – Norsk
 Official language in: Norway 
Nuosu/Yi – ꆈꌠ꒿
 Spoken in: China 
Nyangia – Nyang'i
 Spoken in: the Republic of Uganda

O
Occitan – Occitan
 Official language in: the Spanish comarca of Val d'Aran 
Odia – ଓଡ଼ିଆ
Official language in: the Indian states of Jharkhand and Odisha 
Oirat – ᡆᡕᡅᠷᠠᡑ ᡘᡄᠯᡄᠨ
 Spoken in: Russia  Mongolia  and China 
Oirata – ?
 Spoken in: Indonesia 
Ojibwe – ᐊᓂᔑᓈᐯᒧᐎᓐ
 Spoken by: the Ojibwe people 
Okinawan Japanese – ウチナーヤマトゥグチ
 Recognised Regional Language in: Japan 
Old Church Slavonic † – Словѣ́ньскъ Ѩзꙑ́къ, ⰔⰎⰀⰂⰑⰐⰊⰍ
 Formerly spoken in: Eastern Europe
Old English † – Anglisc, Ænglisc, Englisc, or ᚫᛝᛚᛁᛋᚻ
 Formerly spoken in: Scotland  and Wales 
Omotik † – Laamoot
 Formerly spoken in: Great Rift Valley, Kenya 
Onge – Öñge
 Spoken in: Andaman and Nicobar Islands 
Ontong Java – Luangiua
 Spoken in: Ontong Java Atoll, Solomon Islands 
Oroch – Орочи кэсэни
 Spoken in: Khabarovsk Krai , Russia 
Orok – ульта
 Spoken in: Sakhalin Oblast , Russia 
Oromo – Afaan Oromoo
 Official language in: Oromia  in Ethiopia 
 Recognised Minority Language in: Kenya 
Ossetian – иронау, ирон ӕвзаг
 Spoken in North Ossetia  and South Ossetia 
Note: Georgia but there is a dispute with Russia and Georgia with North Ossetia and South Ossetia is wanting independence.

P
Pahari – पहाड़ी
 Spoken in: the Indian states of Himachal Pradesh, Jammu and Kashmir , Punjab, Sikkim , Uttarakhand, and West Bengal; Nepal , the Pakistani state of Azad Kashmir , and Greater Tibet 
Palula – پالولہ
 Spoken in: the Pakistani district of the Chitral District 
Pandan Bikol – Pandanon
 Spoken in: Catanduanes, Philippines 
Pangasinan – Pangasinan
 Spoken in: Pangasinan, Philippines 
Paratio † – ?
 Spoken in: Brazil 
Parya – Парья
 Spoken in: Afghanistan , Tajikistan  and Uzbekistan 
Pashto – پښتو
 Official language in: Afghanistan 
 Recognised Minority Language in: Pakistan 
Pattani Malay – بهاس جاوي, Bahasa Jawi, or ภาษายาวี
 Spoken in: the Thai provinces of Narathiwat, Pattani, Songkhla, and Yala 
Persian – فارسی
 Official language in: Afghanistan , Iran , and Tajikistan 
Phoenician † – 𐤃𐤁𐤓𐤉𐤌 𐤊𐤍𐤏𐤍𐤉𐤌
 Formerly spoken in: the Near East
Pidgin – ?
Spoken in: Nigeria, Ghana, Cameroon, Equatorial Guinea
Piman – Tepiman
 Spoken in: the State of Arizona, United States  and the Free and Sovereign State of Durango, United Mexican States 
Pipil – Náhuat or Nawat
 Spoken in: the Salvadoran cities of San Salvador  and Sonsonate; and the Salvadoran department of La Libertad 
Pirahã – xapaitíiso
 Spoken in: the Brazilian state of Amazonas .
Pitjantjatjara – Pitjantjatjara
 Spoken in: the northwestern area of the Australian state of South Australia 
Plautdietsch – Plautdietsch
 Spoken in: Eastern Europe, with some scattered speakers in the Americas
Polish – Język polski, polski, or polszczyzna
 Official language in: Poland 
 Recognised Minority Language in: the Czech Republic , Romania , Slovakia , and Ukraine 
Portuguese – Português
 Official language in: Angola , Brazil , Cape Verde , East Timor , Equatorial Guinea , Guinea-Bissau , Macau , Mozambique , Portugal , and São Tomé and Príncipe 
Punjabi – पंजाबी, ਪੰਜਾਬੀ, or پنجابی
 Official language in: the Indian federal district of Delhi ; and the Indian states of Haryana, Himachal Pradesh, Punjab, and West Bengal 
 Recognised Minority Language in: the Pakistani province of Punjab 
Pu-Xian Min – 興化話 or 莆仙話
 Spoken in: the Chinese county of Xianyou  and the Chinese prefecture-level cities of Fuzhou, Putian, and Quanzhou

Q
Quechuan – Runasimi
 Spoken by: the Quechuan people in Argentina , Bolivia , Colombia , Ecuador , and Peru 
Quinqui
 Spoken in: Spain

R
Raga – Hano
 Spoken in: the Pentecost Island, Republic of Vanuatu 
Rajasthani – राजस्थानी
 Spoken in: the Indian state of Rajasthan 
Rinconada – Rinconada
 Spoken in: Camarines Sur, Philippines 
Rohingya – Rohingya
 Official language in: the Rakhine State
Romani – Romani Ćhib
 Spoken by: the Romani people ; recognised as a minority language in Sweden
Romanian – Română
 Official language in: Moldova , Romania , Pridnestrovian Moldavian Republic , and the Serbian autonomous province of Vojvodina 
 Recognised Minority Language in: Hungary , Italy , Serbia , Spain , and Ukraine 
Ramanos † – ?
 Formerly spoken in: Bolivia 
Romansh – Rumantsch
 Official language in: Switzerland 
Russian – Русский
 Official language in: 10 Countries and 4 Organizations
 Recognised Minority Language in: 7 Countries
Rusyn – Русиньский Язык, Русиньска Бесїда
 Official language in: The Serbian autonomous province of Vojvodina 
 Recognised Minority Language in: Croatia , Poland , Romania , Serbia , and Slovakia 
Ruthenian † – Руский Языкъ
 Formerly spoken in: the Polish-Lithuanian Commonwealth  and the Grand Duchy of Lithuania 
Rotokas – Rotokas
 Spoken in: Bougainville  part of Papua New Guinea

S
Sadri – सादरी (नागपुरी), ସାଦ୍ରୀ, সাদরি
 Official language in: India 
Sámi (Inari) – anarâškielâ
 Recognised as a minority language in Finland 
Sámi (Kildin) – Кӣллт са̄мь кӣлл
 Recognised as a minority language in Russia 
Sámi (Lule) – julevsámegiella
 Recognised as a minority language in Norway, Sweden  
Sámi (Northern) – davvisámegiella
 Recognised as a minority language in Finland, Norway, Sweden   
Sámi (Pite) – bidumsámegiella
 Recognised as a minority language in Norway, Sweden  
Sámi (Skolt) – sääʹmǩiõll, nuõrttsääʹmǩiõll
 Recognised as a minority language in Russia, and formerly spoken in Norway  
Sámi (Southern) – åarjelsaemien gïele
 Recognised as a minority language in Norway 
Sámi (Ter) – Са̄мькӣлл, saa´mekiil
 A moribund language spoken in Russia 
Sámi (Ume) – ubmejensámien giella
 Recognised as a minority language in Sweden, and formerly in Norway 
Samoan – Gagana Sāmoa
 Official language in: American Samoa  and Samoa 
Sanskrit – संस्कृतम्, संस्कृता वाक्
 Official language in: India 
Sardinian – Sardu
 Official language in: the Italian autonomous region of Sardinia 
 Recognised Minority Language in: Italy 
Sasak – ᬪᬵᬲᬵᬲᬓ᭄ᬱᬓ᭄
 Spoken in: West Nusa Tenggara , Indonesia 
Saurashtra – ꢱꣃꢬꢵꢰ꣄ꢜ꣄ꢬꢵ
 Spoken in: the Indian states of Andhra Pradesh, Gujarat, Karnataka, Kerala, Maharashtra, and Tamil Nadu 
Scots – Scots, Scottis, Scots leid, Lallans
 Recognised Minority Language in: Northern Ireland  and Scotland 
Scottish Gaelic – Gàidhlig
 Recognised Minority Language in: Scotland 
Serbian – Српски, Srpski
 Official language in: Bosnia and Herzegovina  and Serbia 
 Recognised Minority Language in: Croatia , the Czech Republic , Hungary , Montenegro , North Macedonia , Romania  and Slovakia 
Serbo-Croatian – srpskohrvatski/српскохрватски, also hrvatskosrpski/хрватскосрпски
 Official language in: Bosnia and Herzegovina , Croatia , Montenegro  Serbia 
 Recognised Minority Language in: Austria , Czech Republic , Hungary , Italy , North Macedonia , Romania  and Slovakia 
Serer – Seereer, Seereer-Siin
 Spoken in: the Republic of the Gambia  and the Republic of Senegal 
Shan – လိၵ်ႈတႆး
 Spoken in: the Myanmar states of the Kachin State  and the Shan State  and by the Shan people
Shanghaiese – 上海闲话
 Spoken in: the Chinese municipality of Shanghai 
Sherpa language – शेर्पा, ཤེར་པཱ།
 Official language in: the Indian state of Sikkim 
Shona – Shona
 Official language in: Zimbabwe 
Sicilian – Sicilianu
 Spoken in: the Italian region of Apulia , Calabria , Campania ; the Italian comune of Leece ; Malta ; and the Italian autonomous region of Sicily 
Sikkimese – འབྲས་ལྗོངས་
 Official language in: the Indian state of Sikkim 
Sindhi – سنڌي
 Official language in: India  and the Pakistani province of Sindh 
Sinhala – සිංහල
 Official language in: Sri Lanka 
Slovak – Slovenčina
 Official language in: Slovakia , and the Serbian autonomous province of Vojvodina 
 Recognised Minority Language in: the Czech Republic , Hungary  and Ukraine 
Slovene – Slovenščina
 Official language in: Slovenia 
 Recognised Minority Language in: Austria , Hungary , and Italy 
Somali – اللغة الصومالية, Af-Soomaali
 Official language in: Somalia
 Recognised Minority Language in: Djibouti  and Ethiopia 
Sorani – سۆرانی, Soranî
 Spoken in: Iran and Iraq
Sotho – Sesotho
 Official language in: Lesotho  and South Africa 
Southern Quechua
 Spoken in: Bolivia , Peru , Chile  and Argentina 
Spanish – Español
 Official language in: 21 countries, 6 dependant entities, and 23 international organisations
Stellingwarfs – Stellingwerfs
 Spoken in: the Netherlands 
Sundanese – ᮘᮞ ᮞᮥᮔ᮪ᮓ
 Official language in: the Indonesian province of West Java 
Sumerian † – 𒅴𒂠 (EME.G̃IR15)
 Was spoken in: Southern Iraq  and Southeastern Iran 
 Official language in: the India
Surajpuri  – सुरजापुरी, সুরজাপুরী
 Official language in: India 
Susuami – ?
 Spoken in: Morobe Province , Papua New Guinea 

Swahili – Kiswahili
 Official language in: Kenya , Tanzania , and Uganda 
Swedish – Svenska
 Official language in: Finland  and Sweden 
Swiss German – Schwyzerdütsch
 Spoken in: the Austrian state of Vorarlberg , the Italian regions of the Aosta Valley  and Piedmont , Liechtenstein , and Switzerland 
Sylheti – ছিলটী, সিলেটী
 Spoken in: the Bangladeshi division of Greater Sylhet ; the Indian state of Assam's Barak Valley ; and the Indian state of Tripura

T
Taa – ǃXóõ
 Spoken in: Ghanzi , Kgalagadi , Kweneng , Southern Districts  and Hardap 
Tagalog – ᜏᜒᜃᜅ᜔ ᜆᜄᜎᜓᜄ᜔, Wikang Tagalog
 Official language in: the Philippines 
Tahitian – Reo Mā'ohi, Reo Tahiti
 Spoken in: the French Polynesian area of the Society Islands 
Tai Dam – ꪺꪕꪒꪾ
 Spoken in: the Chinese county of the Jinping Miao, Yao, and Dai Autonomous County 
Tai Khün – ไทเขิน
 Spoken in: Shan State, Republic of the Union of Myanmar  and the Kingdom of Thailand 
Tai Lü – ᦑᦺᦟᦹᧉ
 Spoken in: Yunnan Province, People's Republic of China 
Tai Nüa – ᥖᥭᥰᥖᥬᥳᥑᥨᥒᥰ
 Official language in: the Dehong Dai and Jingpo Autonomous Prefecture, People's Republic of China 
Tajik – Тоҷикӣ
 Official language in: the Tajikistan 
Tamang – तामाङ
 Official language in: Sikkim, Republic of India  and the Federal Democratic Republic of Nepal 
Tamil – தமிழ்
 Official language in: the Indian states of Tamil Nadu, union territories of Pondicherry and Andaman and Nicobar Islands, Sri Lanka , Republic of Singapore 
 Recognised Minority Language in: Malaysia 
Tangut † – 
 Formerly the Official language in: the Tangut Empire (Western Xia)
Tatar – تاتارچا, Tatarça, Tатарча
 Official language in: the Republic of Tatarstan, Russian Federation 
Tausug – Bahasa Sūg
 Spoken in: Sulu, Philippines 
Telugu – తెలుగు
 Official language in: the Indian states of Andhra Pradesh and Telangana and town of Yanam 
Tepes – Soo
 Spoken in: the Republic of Uganda 
Teribe – Naso, Norteño, Quequexque, Teribe, Tiribi, or Térraba
 Spoken in: the Costa Rican provinces of Limón  and Puntarenas , and the Panamanian provinces of Bocas del Toro  and Chiriquí 
Tetum – Lia-Tetun
 Official language in: the Democratic Republic of Timor-Leste 
 Recognised Minority Language in: East Nusa Tenggara, Republic of Indonesia 
Terengganu – Ccakak Tranung
 Spoken in: Terengganu 
Thai – ภาษาไทย
 Official language in: the Kingdom of Thailand
Tibetan – དབུས་སྐད་
 Official language in: the Tibet Autonomous Region, People's Republic of China  and Upper Mustang, Federal Democratic Republic of Nepal 
Tigrinya – ትግርኛ
 Official language in: the State of Eritrea  and the Federal Democratic Republic of Ethiopia 
Tobagonian Creole – ?
 Spoken in: Tobago  part of Trinidad and Tobago 
Tofa – Тоъфа дыл
 Spoken in: Irkutsk Oblast , Russia 
Tok Pisin – Tok Pisin
 Official language in: the Independent State of Papua New Guinea 
Tongan – Lea faka-Tonga
 Official language in: the Kingdom of Tonga 
Tongva † – Gabrielino
 Formerly spoken in: the City of Los Angeles , United States 
Trinidadian Creole – ?
 Spoken in: Trinidad  in Trinidad and Tobago 
Tsez – Цез Мец, Цезяс Мец
 Spoken in: the Republic of Dagestan, Russian Federation 
Tswana – Setswana
 Official language in: the Republic of Botswana , the Republic of South Africa , and the Republic of Zimbabwe 
Tuareg – Tamahaq, Tamajaq, Tamasheq, or ⵜⴰⵎⴰⵌⴰⵆ
 Recognised Minority Language in: the Republic of Mali  and the Republic of Niger 
Tunica – Luhchi Yoroni
 Spoken in: the Louisiana, United States of America 
Tunisian Arabic – تونسي
 Spoken in: Tunisia 
Turkish – Türkçe
 Official language in: Turkey , Northern Cyprus  And Cyprus 
 Spoken in: the Bosnia And Herzegovina . Greece . Iraq . Kosovo . North Macedonia . Romania . Bulgaria . Syria . Netherlands . Belgium . Germany 
Turkmen – Türkmençe or Türkmen dili
 Official language in: Turkmenistan 
 Recognised Minority Language in: Afghanistan 
Tulu – ತುಳು ಬಾಸೆ, തുളു ബാസെ, or 
 Spoken in: the Indian states of Karnataka, Kerala, and Maharashtra 
Tumpoon – ?
 Spoken in: Cambodia 
Tübatulabal – Pakaːnil
 Spoken in: California 
Tuvan – тыва дыл
 Spoken in: Tuva 
Tzeltal– Bats'il k'op
 Spoken in: Chiapas, Mexico
Tzotzil– Batsʼi kʼop
 Spoken in: Chiapas, Mexico

U
Ubykh † – twaxəbza
 Formerly spoken in: Turkey 
Uduk – Tw'ampa or T'wampa
 Spoken in: the Federal Democratic Republic of South Sudan  and the Republic of the Sudan 
Ukrainian – Українська
 Official language in: the Pridnestrovian Moldavian Republic  and Ukraine 
 Recognised Minority Language in: Bosnia and Herzegovina , the Republic of Croatia , the Czech Republic , Hungary , the Republic of Moldova , the Republic of Poland , Romania , the Republic of Serbia , and the Slovak Republic 
Upper Sorbian – Hornjoserbsce
 Spoken in: the State of Saxony  in Germany  
Urdu – اُردُو
 Official language in: the Islamic Republic of Pakistan  and the Indian states of Bihar, Delhi, Jammu and Kashmir , Uttar Pradesh, Jharkhand, West Bengal, and Telangana 
Uspanteco – uspantek
 Spoken in: Guatemala 
Uyghur – ئۇيغۇر تىلى
 Official language in: the Chinese autonomous region of Xinjiang  and Recognised Minority Language of Kazakhstan 
Uzbek – اوزبیک, Ўзбек, Oʻzbek
 Official language in: the Republic of Uzbekistan

V
Vaagri Booli – ஃஅக்கிபிக்கி
 Spoken in: Tamil Nadu , Andhra Pradesh , Puducherry , Karnataka, Maharashtra , and all in India 
Vai – ꕙꔤ
 Spoken in: Liberia  and Sierra Leone 
Valencian – Valencià
 Official language in: the Spanish autonomous community of Valencia 
Vedda – ?
 Spoken in: Uva Province  of Sri Lanka 
Venda – Tshivenḓa
 Official language in: the Republic of South Africa  and the Republic of Zimbabwe 
Venetian – Vèneto
 Official language in: the Italian region of Veneto 
Vietnamese – Tiếng Việt Nam
 Official language in: the Socialist Republic of Vietnam 
 Recognised Minority Language in: the Czech Republic 
Vincentian Creole – Naygar (meaning people not Vincentian Creole)
 Spoken in: Saint Vincent and the Grenadines 
Vlax Romani – řomani čhib
 Generally spoken in: Southeastern Europe
Volapük – Volapük
 International language invented by Johann Martin Schleyer 
Votic – Vaddja
 Spoken in: Ingria  in Russia 
Võro – Võro Kiil
 Spoken in: Southern Estonia

W
Walloon – Walon
 Spoken in: the Belgian region of Wallonia 
Warlpiri – Warlpiri
 Spoken in: the Australian Northern Territory 
Welsh – Cymraeg
 Official language in: the British country of Wales 
 Recognised Minority Language in: the Argentine Republic  and the United Kingdom 
Western Itelmen – итэнмэн
 Spoken in: Kamchatka Krai   in Russia 
West Frisian – Frysk
 Official language in: the Dutch province of Friesland 
Wintu – wintʰuːh
 Spoken in: California 
Wolof – Wolof
 Spoken in: the Republic of the Gambia , the Islamic Republic of Mauritania , and the Republic of Senegal 
Wu – 吴方言
 Spoken in: the southern region of the Chinese province of Jiangsu, the entire province of Zhejiang, and the municipality of Shanghai

X
Xaracuu – Kanala, Xârâcùù
 Spoken in: the French special collectivity of New Caledonia 
Xhosa – isiXhosa
 Official language in: the Republic of South Africa  and the Republic of Zimbabwe 
Xiang – 湘语
 Spoken in: the northern region of the Chinese province of Guangxi and the central and southwestern regions of the province of Hunan 
Xibe – 
 Spoken in: the Chinese autonomous region of Xinjiang 
Xucuru † – ?
 Formerly spoken in: Brazil 
Xiriâna † – Bahwana
 Formerly spoken in: Brazil

Y
Yapese – Yapese
 Spoken in: the Micronesian island of Yap 
Yakut – Саха тыла
 Official language in: Yakutia  or Sakha  in Russia 
Yanesha' – Yanešač̣
 Spoken in: the Peruvian department of Pasco 
Yiddish – ייִדיש	
 Official language in: the Russian Jewish Autonomous Oblast 
 Recognised as a minority language in Bosnia and Herzegovina , the State of Israel , the Netherlands , the Republic of Poland , Romania , the Kingdom of Sweden , and Ukraine 
Yoruba – Èdè Yorùbá
 Official language in: the Federal Republic of Nigeria 
Yuchi – Tsoyaha
 Spoken in: Oklahoma  
Yue – 粵語, 粤语, 廣東話, or 广东话
 Spoken in: the Chinese province of Guangdong and the autonomous region of Guangxi

Z
Zaghawa – Beria
 Spoken in: Sudan  and Chad 
Zaza – Zazaki
 Spoken in: Tunceli , Bingöl  and parts of Elazığ , Erzincan  and Diyarbakır 
Zulu – isiZulu
 Official language in: the Republic of South Africa 
Zuni – Shiwi’ma
 Spoken in: New Mexico and Arizona  in the United States 
Zuojiang Zhuang – 話僮
 Spoken in: the Chinese autonomous region of Guangxi 
Zyphe Chin – ?
 Spoken in: Chin State  and India

Alphabets and scripts
† = Extinct dialect

'
'Phags-pa † – 
 Formerly Used in: the People's Republic of China , the Republic of India , Mongolia , and Greater Tibet

A–M
Abkhaz – Aҧсшәа
 Used in: the Republic of Abkhazia  and the Autonomous Republic of Abkhazia, Georgia 
Anglo-Saxon † – ᚠᚢᚦᚩᚱᚳ
 Formerly Used in: Anglo-Saxon England 
Armenian Alphabet – Հայկական Այբուբեն
 Used in: Armenia , the Republic of Cyprus , the Islamic Republic of Iran , Artsakh , the Republic of Poland , Romania , and the United States 
Avestan – 𐬆𐬬𐬈𐬯𐬙𐬆𐬥
 Spoken on: the Eastern Iranian Plateau 
Basahan † – Guhit
 Used in: Bicol Region, Philippines 
Baybayin † – ᜊᜌ᜔ᜊᜌᜒᜈ᜔
 Used in: the Philippines 
Bopomofo – ㄓㄨˋ ㄧㄣ ㄈㄨˊ ㄏㄠˋ
 Used in: the People's Republic of China 
Borama – 𐒄𐒋𐒦𐒩𐒗𐒓
 Used in: the Federal Republic of Somalia 
Braille – ⠃⠗⠁⠊⠇⠑
 Braille is a tactile writing system, versions of which are used for many different languages and also used for the blind.
Carian – 𐊴𐊠𐊥𐊹𐊠𐊵
 Formerly used in: Western Anatolia
Deseret – 𐐔𐐯𐑅𐐨𐑉𐐯𐐻
 The Deseret alphabet is a Mormon liturgical script
Glagolitic † – Кѷрїлловица, ⰍⱛⰓⰊⰎⰎⰑⰂⱄⰜⰀ
 Formerly used by: the Middle Age Slavic people
Hanunó'o – ᜱᜨᜳᜨᜳᜢ
 Used in: Mindoro, Philippines 
Kayah Li – ꤊꤢꤛꤢꤟ ꤜꤤ
 Used in: the Kayah, Republic of the Union of Myanmar 
Kulitan – 
 Used in: Pampanga, Philippines 
Mandombe – Mandombe
 Used in: Western Africa

N–T
N'Ko – ߒߞߏ
 Used in: Guinea and Ivory Coast
Osmanya – 𐒋𐒘𐒈𐒑𐒛𐒒𐒕𐒀
 Used in: the Federal Republic of Somalia 
Runic † – ᚱᚢᚾᛟ
 Formerly Used by: 2nd Century Germanics
Shavian – 𐑖𐑱𐑝𐑾𐑯
 Invented by Ronald Kingsley Read  as an alternative phonetic alphabet to the English language.
Siddhaṃ – 𑖭𑖰𑖟𑖿𑖠𑖽
 Used in: Central Asia, Japan
Tagbanwa – ᝦᝪᝨᝯ
 Used in: Palawan, Philippines 
Tai Tham – ᨲ᩠ᩅᩫᨾᩮᩬᩥᨦ
 Used in: Southeast Asia
† = Extinct alphabet or Script

Dialects

ǂ
ǂAkhoe – ǂAkhoe Haiǁom
 Spoken in: Angola , Botswana , Namibia , and South Africa

A–K
Albanian (Gheg) – gegnisht
 Spoken in: Albania 
Albanian (Tosk) – toskërisht
 Spoken in: Albania 
Amoy – 廈門話 or 厦门话
 Spoken in: the southern area of the Chinese province of Fujian 
Armenian (Eastern) – Արևելահայերեն
 Spoken in: Armenia 
Armenian (Western) – Արեւմտահայերէն
 Spoken by: the Armenian Diaspora 
Fuzhou – 平話 or 福州話
 Spoken in: East Asia
Hazāragī – هزارگی
 Spoken in: Afghanistan , Iran , and Pakistan 
Hokkien – 福佬話
 Spoken in: the southern area of the Chinese province of Fujian , Taiwan , and in Southeast Asia
Kwanyama – Oshikwanyama
 Spoken in: Angola  and Namibia

M–T
Meänkieli – Meänkieli
 Recognised Minority Language in: Kingdom of Sweden 
Monégasque – Munegascu
 Spoken in: Monaco 
Māori English – Māori English
 Spoken in: New Zealand
Ningbo – 寧波閒話
 Spoken in: the Chinese sub-provincial division of Ningbo 
Pothohari – پوٹھوهاری or پوٹھواری
 Spoken in: the Pakistani state of Azad Kashmir 
Quanzhou – 泉州話
 Spoken in: the southern area of the Chinese province of Fujian 
Sapudi
– Bhâsa Sapudi
 Spoken in: Sapudi Island, Indonesia 
Saraiki – سرائیکی, ਸਰਾਇਕੀ, सराइकी
 Spoken in: the Pakistani province of Bahawalpur South Punjab 
Seroa † – ǃGãǃne, ǁKuǁe
 Formerly spoken in: Lesotho  and South Africa 
 (Seroa is a "click language".)
Teochew – 潮州話
 Spoken by: the Chinese Teochew people

Required fonts
Many languages require special fonts in order to display correctly. Most use fonts from the font family Noto, created by Google. They can be downloaded here.

See also
 Language
 Lists of extinct languages
 Lists of languages
 Official languages of the UN (United Nations)

External links
 Language names — A similar list of "autoglottonyms" on omniglot.com. Retrieved 2017-01-07.
 Languages in their own writing systems — Another such list on geonames.de. Retrieved 2017-01-07.

Names
Language
Language naming